Senator Welch may also refer to:

Members of the United States Senate
Adonijah Welch (1821–1889), U.S. Senator from Florida
Peter Welch (born 1947), U.S. Senator from Vermont

United States state senate members
David E. Welch (1835–after 1900), Wisconsin State Senate
Henry Kirke White Welch (1821–1870), Connecticut State Senate
James T. Welch (born 1975), Massachusetts State Senate
John Welch (politician) (1805–1891), Ohio State Senate
Patrick Welch (1948–2020), Illinois State Senate
Robert Welch (Wisconsin politician) (born 1958), Wisconsin State Senate
William W. Welch (1818–1892), Connecticut State Senate